Clifford Dwight Waldo (September 28, 1913 – October 27, 2000) was an American political scientist and is perhaps the defining figure in modern public administration. Waldo's career was often directed against a scientific/technical portrayal of bureaucracy and government that now suggests the term public management as opposed to public administration. Recognized the world over for his contributions to the theory of bureaucratic government, Waldo is only now taking his place as one of the most important political scientists of the last 100 years.

Life and career
Born in rural DeWitt, Nebraska, and trained first in a local Wesleyan college and then a Nebraska normal school as a teacher, Waldo was eventually educated in political theory at the University of Nebraska (MA) and Yale University (PhD) where he was advised by Francis Coker.

He came to shape much of the future of scholarship in the field of Public Administration. His Yale dissertation was reworked after civil service during World War II into a classic work of public administration called The Administrative State, published in 1948. Waldo challenged mainstream scholars' view of public administration as a value-free, non-partisan social science that promised to make government more efficient and effective. Professor Camilla Stivers has observed, "Despite public administration's claim to be a science, Waldo declares, it is a political theory [....] Political theory looks to error in the world and aims to envision new possibilities. It is critical rather than objective, suggestive rather than conclusive." In short, "efficiency" itself is a value, and it can run counter to other values, such as democratic participation in governance.

Waldo also is famous for the debate he had with Herbert A. Simon on the nature of bureaucracy in American Political Science Review just after World War II. Eventually he taught at the University of California, Berkeley and the Maxwell School at Syracuse University, and Virginia Tech where he influenced many future scholars of government. He had profound influence on a number of young academics in the late 1960s by organizing the Minnowbrook Conference. Others deeply indebted to Waldo for guidance and sponsorship include H. George Frederickson and Gary Wamsley.

Selected publications
 The Administrative State: a Study of the Political Theory of American Public Administration (New York: Ronald Press Co, 1948; rev ed New York: Holmes & Meier, 1984)
 The study of public administration (New York : Random House, 1955)
 Perspectives on administration (University of Alabama Press, 1956)
 The novelist on organization & administration; an inquiry into the relationship between two worlds (Berkeley: Institute of Governmental Studies, University of California, 1968) Development A
Ideas and Issues in Public Administration.(1953)
Comparative Public Administration – Prologue Problems and Promise
The Enterprise of Public Administration.
Temporal Dimensions of Development Administration. (1970) – editor
Public administration in Time Of Turbulence!(1971) – editor

References

Further reading
 Brian R. Fry: Mastering Public Administration: From Max Weber to Dwight Waldo (Chatham, N.J.: Chatham House, 1989)
 Brack Brown & Richard J. Stillman, II: A Search for Public Administration: The Ideas and Career of Dwight Waldo (College Station, Texas: Texas A&M University Press, 1986).
See also H. George Frederickson and Frank Marini: "Bureaucracy and Democracy: Essays in Honor of Dwight Waldo" and "Modern Comparative Administration: Essays in Honor of Dwight Waldo," Public Administration Review (May/June 1997, Vol 57, No 3., and June/July 1997, Vol 57, No 4).

External links

 Stillman, Richard, Public Affairs Report, Vol. 42, No. 1, Spring 2001, National Academy of Public Administration, Institute of Governmental Studies, UC Berkeley.
 , Public Affairs Report, Vol. 41, No. 5, Winter 2000, National Academy of Public Administration, Institute of Governmental Studies, UC Berkeley.

1913 births
2000 deaths
People from Saline County, Nebraska
University of Nebraska–Lincoln alumni
American political scientists
Public administration scholars
Yale University alumni
20th-century political scientists